Yo-Yo Boing! (1998) is a postmodern novel in English, Spanish, and Spanglish by Puerto Rican author Giannina Braschi. The cross-genre work is a structural hybrid of poetry, political philosophy, musical, manifesto, treatise, memoir, and drama. The work addresses tensions between Anglo-American and Hispanic-American cultures in the United States.

Giannina Braschi

Giannina Braschi, a National Endowment for the Arts fellow, is considered an influential and "revolutionary voice" in contemporary Latin American literature. Braschi's Empire of Dreams is a postmodern poetry classic, first published in Spain in 1988. Her most recent work is the postcolonial dramatic novel United States of Banana (2011). Braschi's collective work explores the politics of empire and independence, while capturing the trials and tribulations of the Latin American immigrant in the United States. With the republication of United States of Banana and her other works in 2011, CARAS Magazine ranked Braschi in 2012 as one of the most influential Puerto Ricans of the year.

Description
Yo-Yo Boing! has many examples of the linguistic phenomena of code-switching between English and Spanish, as spoken by millions of Latinos and Hispanic-Americans in the United States and in Puerto Rico. It is the first full-length novel to use Spanglish as a high art form. The translingualism in this Latino narrative anticipated multicultural readers who could readily decode both languages in order to co-construct the storyworld.

Through dramatic dialogues and conversations among a nameless chorus of voices, the work treats subjects as diverse as racial, ethnic, and sexual prejudice, discrimination, colonialism, Puerto Rican independence, revolution, domestic violence, and writer's block. In the book, intellectuals and artists debate English-only laws, ethnic cleansing campaigns, and the corporate censorship.

The dialogue also refers to popular culture, Latin American boom, films, sex, poetry, and Puerto Rican artistic expression in New York. Artists and celebrities such as Woody Allen, Almodovar, Michael Jackson, Madonna, Pavarotti, Martin Scorsese, Fellini, Pee-Wee Herman, and Nabokov are celebrated and derided.

Reception
Marc Zimmerman qualified the reception of Yo-Yo Boing! by Latin American scholars as "a work heralded by such gurus as Jean Franco, Doris Sommer, and Diamela Eltit and seen as the most complex and experimental of US Puerto Rican fiction yet to be written."  Frederick Luis Aldama stated, "Braschi is recognized as one of today's foremost experimental Latinx authors. Braschi's vibrant, bilingually shaped creative expressions and innovation spring from her Latinidad, her Puerto Rican-ness. (In this work) we discover as much about US/Puerto Rico sociopolitical histories as we encounter the metaphysical and existential explorations of a Cervantes, Rabelais, Diderot, Artaud, Joyce, Beckett, Stein, Borges, Cortázar, and Rosario Castellanos." In "Yo-Yo Boing! and Its Critical Reception," Christopher Gonzalez noted the early reviews published in English by monolingual reviewers were "at once laudatory and hesitant." Publishers Weekly called it "a literary liberation and a frustrating challenge" and Kirkus Reviews called it  "a fractious comic novel by Braschi, a highly praised Puerto Rican poet... This in-your-face assertion of the vitality of Latino culture has many agreeable moments, but—let’s face it—how much of its potential readership will be able to understand more than half of it?" Gonzalez posits that "because Braschi owns every aspect of her story-world blueprint due to her equal mastery and fluency in Spanish and English," non-Spanish speaking reviewers considered the work "an affront."  Whereas, he notes that bilingual reviewers, such as David William Foster in Review of Contemporary Fiction  praised Yo-Yo Boing! for its "superb exploration for the lived experiences of Hispanics." Debra A. Castillo qualified the work's artistry in this way, “While the author may write big books in terms of the traditional expectations about the poetic genre, she is as concerned about the microlevel of her work as the most highly elaborated lyricist. Braschi’s attention to tone and rhythm, to the music of her text, is extreme.” Harold Augenbraum, Ilan Stavans, Doris Sommer, Adriana Estill, Christopher Gonzalez, and other critics have used the phrase "a tour de force" to describe Yo-Yo Boing!

Ilan Stavans stated in Spanglish, "I have always visto a Giannina Braschi como mi heroína. And I’m an adicto... There is something mágico in her juego de palabras, her exploration of tenses, her anxious, uncompromising bilingüismo que ni es de aquí ni es de aquí ni es de allá, ni tiene age ni porvenir, y ser feliz es su color, su identity. Braschi crea una lexicography that is and isn’t atrapada en el presente.” Stavans was among the first professors to teach Yo-Yo Boing! (Amherst 2002) and dedicate a conference to Spanglish literature (Amherst 2004). Nearly 20 years later, in 2020, Yo-Yo Boing! is now on the course syllabus for classes in Spanglish, Bilingualism, Linguistics, Latino/a Literature, Puerto Rican Studies, Nuyorican Poetry, Latin American fiction, Experimental Literature, and Avant-garde Theater and Performance.

References

Further reading

 Aldama, Frederick Luis and O’Dwyer, Tess, eds. Poets, Philosophers, Lovers: On the Writings of Giannina Braschi. University of Pittsburgh Press. (2020) 
 Aldama, Frederick Luis. The Routledge Concise History of Latino/a Literature. Routledge. (2013)
 Allatson, Paul. "From 'Latinidad' to 'Latinid@ des': Imagining the Twenty-First Century". The Cambridge Companion to Latina/o American Literature. (2016)
 Breton, Dominique and Tinchant-Benrahhao, Sabine. "Traduire le spanglish à Porto Rico dans la Grande Caraïbe: le cas de Yo Yo Boing! de Giannina Braschi" (2016)
 Carroll, Julia. "Spanish Affect and Its Effects: Bilingual Process in Giannina Braschi's Yo-Yo Boing!" Leading Ladies: mujeres en la literatura hispana y en las artes. (2006)
 Callahan, L., "The role of register in Spanish-English code-switching in prose", Bilingual Review/La Revista Bilingüe, 2003.
 Castillo, Debra A. "Language Games: Hinojosa-Smith, Prida, Braschi". Redreaming America: Toward a Bilingual American Culture. State University of New York. (2005)
 Cruz-Malavé, Arnaldo,  "Under the Skirt of Liberty: Giannina Braschi Rewrites Empire", Americas Quarterly. 66(3):801–818. (2014) 
 D'Amore, Anna Maria. "Spanglish". Translating Contemporary Mexican Texts: Fidelity to Alterity. Peter Lang. (2009)
 De Mojica, Sarah González. "Sujetos híbridos en la literatura puertorriqueña: Daniel Santos y Yo-Yo Boing!". Literaturas heterogéneas y créoles.  Revista de crítica literaria latinoamericana 187–203. (2002)
 De Mojica, Sarah González. "Literaturas heterogéneas e hibridaciones créoles: sujetos andinos y caribes". Cuadernos de Literatura 6.11. (2000)
 Dessús, Virginia. "Identidad(es) postmoderna(s): Yo-Yo Boing! de Giannina Braschi." La Torre: Revista de la Universidad de Puerto Rico 6.22. (2001)
 Estill, Adriana. Review of Yo-Yo Boing! Letras Femeninas 25.1.224. (1999)
 Foster, David William. Review of Contemporary Fiction 19.1.202. (1999)
 Ghosal, Torsa. "How I Learned to Love Experimental Fiction as a Brown Girl by Seeking Out Books by Women of Color". Bustle. (January 25, 2019)
 Goldman, Dara Ellen. "Boricua Unbound: Diasporic Self-Fashioning in Giannina Braschi’s Yo-Yo Boing!" Modern Language Association Convention. (2005)
 Goldstein, Dara, Complicating constructions: race, ethnicity, and hybridity in American texts, AB Thacker, 2008.
 González, Christopher. "Translingual Minds, Narrative Encounters: Reading Challenges in Piri Thomas’s Down These Mean Streets and Giannina Braschi's Yo-Yo Boing!" Permissible Narratives: The Promise of Latino/a Literature (on Oscar “Zeta” Acosta, Gloria Anzaldúa, Piri Thomas, Giannina Braschi, Gilbert Hernandez, Sandra Cisneros, and Junot Díaz). The Ohio State University Press. (2017)
 Guzmán, Gualberto A. "Visualizing and Understanding Code-Switching", MMUF Journal. Mellon/Brandeis/Harvard. (2017)
 Haydée-Rivera, Carmen. "Embracing alternate discourses on migration: Giannina Braschi's and Luisita López Torregrosa's multi-dimensional literary schemes". Revista Umbral. (2014)
 Haydee Rivera, Carmen, "El poder de la palabra y la experiencia transnacional: una entrevista con Giannina Braschi", Op-Cit: Revista del Centro de Investigaciones Históricas, Puerto Rico, 2013.
 Irish, Jennifer Erin. "Radical Bodies and Voices of Difference: US Puerto Rican Women’s Humor and Excess in Erika Lopez’s Flaming Iguanas and Giannina Braschi's Yo-Yo Boing! "Strangers at Home: Re/Presenting Intersectional Identities in Contemporary Caribbean Latina Narratives." Florida State University. (2018)
 "Kirkus Reviews Yo-Yo Boing!" Kirkus Reviews 66.18.1328. (9/15/1998)
 Lomask, Laurie. "Los heraldos negros en contacto con Nueva York: contexto histórico, traducciones al inglés e influencia en artistas norteamericanos." Archivo Vallejo 4.4: 435-443. (2019)
 Loustau, Laura R. "Nomadismos lingüísticos y culturales en Yo-Yo Boing! de Giannina Braschi". Revista Iberoamericana 71.211 (2005)
 Loustau, Laura R. "Cuerpos errantes: Literatura latina y latinoamericana en Estados Unidos (Guillermo Gómez-Peña, Giannina Braschi, Cristina García (journalist), Luisa Valenzuela). Beatriz Viterbo Editora. (2002)  9508451181
 Mendoza de Jesus, Ronald. “Assuming a Body? Embodiment, Opacity, and Resistance in Giannina Braschi’s Close Up”. Body, Institution, Memory Symposium. U of the West Indies. (2013)
 Monclova, Marta S. Rivera. Discrimination, Evasion, and Livability in Four New York Puerto Rican narratives. Tufts University. (2010)
 Francisco Moreno-Fernández.  “Yo-Yo Boing! Or Literature as a Translingual Practice”. Poets, Philosophers, Lovers: On the Writings of Giannina Braschi. Aldama, Frederick Luis and O’Dwyer, Tess, eds. University of Pittsburgh Press. (2020)
 Nesta, Nicola. "Code-switching e identità: il caso dello Spanglish e la narrativa bilingue di Giannina Braschi." Liguori Editore. (2012)
 O’Dwyer, Tess. “Grunting and Grooming in a Room of One’s Own: On Translating Giannina Braschi’s Yo-Yo Boing!” Artful Dodge.  (1998)
 Osborne, Elizabeth. "El espacio del entremedio como espacio de negociación y provocación en Yo-Yo Boing! de Giannina Braschi." (2010)
 Paul, Crystal. “12 Books of Poetry by Writers of Color for a More Inclusive National Poetry Month” Bustle. (April 13, 2016)
 Pérez, Rolando. "The Bilingualisms of Latino/a Literatures" Ilan Stavans, ed. The Oxford Handbook of Latino Studies. (2020)
 Perisic, Alexandra. Precarious Crossings: Immigration, Neoliberalism, and the Atlantic (on Roberto Bolaño, Giannina Braschi, Maryse Condé, Fatou Diome, Marie Ndiaye, and Caryl Phillips). The Ohio State University Press. (2019)
 Popovich, Ljudmila Mila. "Metafictions, Migrations, Metalives: Narrative Innovations and Migrant Women's Aesthetics in Giannina Braschi and Etel Adnan." International Journal of the Humanities. (2011)
 Robles, Rojo. Cinegrafia: Literatura, Espectadores y Cinefilia Contemporanea en Latinoamerica. Dissertation. City University of New York (2020)
 Waldron, John V. Review of Estados Unidos de Banana. Trad. Manuel Broncano. Feministas Unidas. (2018)
 Steinberg, Sybil S. “Book Review: Yo-Yo Boing!” Publishers Weekly. (1998)  
 Singh, Deepak. “Construyendo una Identidad Propia: Estrategias de Subversión en Yo-Yo Boing! de Giannina Braschi y en Brick Lane de {{Mónica Ali.” Investigación. Uniamazonía. (2016) 
 Sommer, Doris and Vega-Merino, Alexandra. Introduction. "Either and." Yo-Yo Boing! Discovery Series: Latin American Literary Review Press. (1998)
 Stanchich, Maritza. "Bilingual Big Bang: Giannina Braschi's Trilogy Levels the Spanish-English Playing Field". Aldama, Frederick Luis and O'Dwyer, Tess, eds.Poets, Philosophers, Lovers: On the Writings of Giannina Braschi. U Pittsburgh.  (2020) 
 Stanchich, Maritza. "'Borinkee' in Hawai'i." Writing Off the Hyphen: New Critical Perspectives on the Literature of the Puerto Rican Diaspora the Puerto Rican Diaspora. U Washington Press. (2008) 
 Stanchich, Martiza G., Insular interventions: diasporic Puerto Rican literature bilanguaging toward a greater Puerto Rico, University of California, Santa Cruz, 2003.
 Stanchich, Martiza G. "Whose English is it Anyway? Giannina Braschi Levels the Bilingual Playing Field", Modern Language Association Convention, January 5, 2013.
 Stavans, Ilan. Foreword. "Poets, Philosophers, Lovers: On the Writings of Giannina Braschi." Aldama, Frederick Luis and O'Dwyer, Tess, eds. University of Pittsburgh Press. (2020)
 Stavans, Ilan. Spanglish: The Making of a New American Language. Harper Collins. (2003)
 Stavans, Ilan, "My Love Affair with Spanglish, in Lives in Translation: Bilingual Writers on Identity and Creativity, edited y Isabelle de Courtivron, Palgrave, 2003.
 Stavans, Ilan, "Latin lingo: Spanglish is everywhere now, which is no problema for some, but a pain in the cuello for purists," The Boston Globe, September 14, 2003.
 Torres, Lourdes. "In the Zone: Code-Switching Strategies by Latino/a writers." Melus 32.1. (2007)
 Torres-Padilla, José L. "When Hybridity Doesn't Resist: Giannina Braschi's Yo-Yo Boing!". Complicating Constructions: Race, Ethnicty, and Hybridity in American Texts. Goldstein, David S. and Thacker, Audrey B., eds. U Washington Press. (2007)
 Valle Narciso, José María. "Las dos caras de la reivindicación social en Yo-Yo Boing!" Label Me Latina/o. (2018)
O'Dwyer, Tess, "Grunting and Grooming in a Room of One's Own: On Translating Giannina Braschi's Yo-Yo Boing!", Artful Dodge, New York, August 10, 1998.
Rivera Monclova, Marta S., [http://gradworks.umi.com/3403442.pdfdoctoral Discrimination, Evasion, and Liability in Four New York Puerto Rican Narratives"], Tufts University, 2010.
Hitchcock, Peter. "Novelization in Decolonization, or, Postcolonialism Reconsidered." Other Globes. Palgrave Macmillan, Cham, 2019. 177-194.
Marting, Diane E., "New/Nueva York in Giannina Braschi's 'Poetic Egg': Fragile Identity, Postmodernism, and Globalization", The Global South, volume 4-1, Indiana University Press, Spring 2010.
Gonzalez Viana, Eduardo, Cruce de fronteras: Antología de escritores iberoamericanos en Estados Unidos, 2013 . 
Paz Soldán, Edmundo and Fuguet, Alberto, "Se habla español," Santillana USA/Alfaguara, 2000.
Von Haesondonck, Kristian, "Enchantment or Fright: Identity and Postmodern Writing in Contemporary Puerto Rico", in Cultural Identity and Postmodern Writing, edited by Theo D'haen and Pieter Vermeulen, Editions Rodopi, 2006. 
Zimmerman, Marc, Defending Their Own in the Cold: The Cultural Turns of U.S. Puerto Ricans,'' University of Illinois, Chicago, 2011. 
Torres, L. "In the contact zone: Code-switching strategies by Latino/a writers," Melus, 2007.

External links
 Author bio: Library of Congress, 2012.
, video "Future of the Spanish Language," Oppenheimer Presents, Miami, November 21, 2009.
, video "United States of Banana," Michael Somoroff, Director, New York, September 2011.
, bilingual excerpts from Yo-Yo Boing!
, WAPA TV, "Escritora puertorriqueña que poco a poco se ha abierto paso en Estados Unidos" by Normando Valentín, December 2011.
"Nuyorican Power," program on Nuyorican culture, featuring Giannina Braschi, Produced By: Evan B. Stone & Carrie Pyle for  CURRENT TV.
 Latino Poetry
A la Vielle Russie Evergreen Review

1989 American novels
Hispanic and Latino American novels
Spanish-language novels
Latin American novels
Metafictional novels
Postmodern novels
Puerto Rican culture in the United States
Puerto Rican plays
Postcolonial novels
Novels set in New York City
Multiculturalism in the United States
Literature by Hispanic and Latino American women